Loop line could refer to:

Uses in communications and circuits
Loop around, telephone company test circuit
Loopback, electrical or datacomm loop

Uses in transportation
Loop line (railway)
Loop Line, Chongqing Rail Transit, Chongqing, China
The Loop (CTA), Chicago, USA

See also 
Circle Line (disambiguation)